The  Idaho Centennial Trail (ICT) is a scenic trail through Idaho. It winds its way through various ecosystems, from high desert canyon lands in Southern Idaho to wet mountain forests in Northern Idaho. ICT travelers will cross many mountains, streams, and rivers.

History
A trail connecting the Northern and Southern borders of Idaho was first envisioned in the 1980s.  Roger Williams and Syd Tate initially conceptualized this trail in 1986. Williams and Tate made a challenging three-month-long, twelve hundred mile journey over the entire length of Idaho during which the official route was drafted.

The ICT was designated as the official state trail during Idaho's Centennial year in 1990 by the Lasting Legacy Committee of the Idaho Centennial Commission. Since then, the number of hikers completing the trail has remained low.

Route

The Idaho Centennial Trail (ICT) route is along existing trails and primitive roads. Hikers typically start at the southern trailhead near Murphy Hot Springs on the Idaho-Nevada border in early June when snow levels are starting to recede and travel northward through high desert with the goal of entering higher country before the heat of summer sets in. To complete the trail within this timeframe, the end of the trail at the Idaho-British Columbia border must then be reached before the snows of late September/early October.

Within these areas, the trail borders Middle Fork of the Salmon River and the Selway River. These rivers are both designated as National Wild and Scenic Rivers, a designation due largely to Frank Church, for whom one of Idaho's Wilderness areas is named.

Dozens of high mountain lakes along this portion of the route are frequented by anglers and sightseers.

Terrain
The trail features many climbs and descents.

Controlling Agencies
The Idaho State Centennial Trail is a cooperative effort. The Idaho Department of Parks and Recreation provides overall trail coordination. The Bureau of Land Management manages the southern section of the trail, while the U.S. Forest Service manages the middle and northern sections of the trail. Private and other public land agencies allow trail users to cross their property for continuity.

Maps
U.S. Forest Service maps, Bureau of Land Management maps, and U.S. Geological Survey (USGS) 1-24,000 scale topographic hard copy maps or topographic software such as National Geographic TOPO! are recommended for planning and on-trail use. For a current map, view the Idaho Centennial Trail interactive online map.

Trail Guide
In 1998, Stephen Stuebner's Idaho Centennial Trail Guidebook was published.  This guidebook, although well written, is considered to be out of date by the Idaho Centennial Trail coordinator, Leo Hennessy.

References

External links

 Idaho Centennial Trail interactive online map
 Idaho Centennial Trail Trail description and information from the State of Idaho Parks and Recreation
 Official Trail Maps A digital representation of the ICT
 Ultralight Adventure Equipment Thru-hiker's journal, photos and information
 Idaho Centennial Trail Blog Blog for hikers of the ICT
 Idaho's Centennial Trail Outdoor Idaho DVD

Hiking trails in Idaho
Long-distance trails in the United States